Syrittosyrphus opacea is a species of hoverfly in the family Syrphidae.

Distribution
South Africa.

References

Eristalinae
Insects described in 1944
Diptera of Africa
Taxa named by Frank Montgomery Hull